Jade Vix (born 3 May 1997) is a French ice hockey player, most recently of the Montreal Carabins women's ice hockey program during the 2018–19 U Sports women's ice hockey season.

She represented France at the 2019 IIHF Women's World Championship.

References

External links

1997 births
Living people
French expatriate ice hockey people
French expatriate sportspeople in Canada
French women's ice hockey forwards
Sportspeople from Strasbourg
Montreal Carabins women's ice hockey players